The Registan (Uzbek: Регистон, Registon) was the heart of the ancient city of Samarkand of the Timurid Empire, now in Uzbekistan. The name Rēgistan means "sandy place" or "desert" in Persian.

The Registan was a public square, where people gathered to hear royal proclamations, heralded by blasts on enormous copper pipes called dzharchis - and a place of public executions. It is framed by three madrasahs (Islamic schools) of distinctive Islamic architecture. The square was regarded as the hub of the Timurid Renaissance.

Madrasahs
The three madrasahs of the Registan are the Ulugh Beg Madrasah (1417–1420), the Sher-Dor Madrasah (1619–1636), and the Tilya-Kori Madrasah (1646–1660). Madrasah is an Arabic term meaning school.

Ulugh Beg Madrasah (1417–1420)
The Ulugh Beg Madrasah, built by Ulugh Beg during the Timurid Empire era of Timur, has an imposing iwan with a lancet-arch pishtaq or portal facing the square. The corners are flanked by high minarets. The mosaic panel over the iwan's entrance arch is decorated by geometrical stylized ornaments. The square courtyard includes a mosque and lecture rooms, and is fringed by the dormitory cells in which students lived. There are deep galleries along the axes. Originally the Ulugh Beg Madrasah was a two-storied building with four domed darskhonas (lecture rooms) at the corners.

The Ulugh Beg Madrasah was one of the best clergy universities of the Muslim Orient in the 15th century CE. Abdul-Rahman Jami, the great Persian poet, scholar, mystic, scientist and philosopher studied at the madrasah. Ulugh Beg himself gave lectures there. During Ulugh Beg's government the madrasah was a centre of learning

Sher-Dor Madrasah (1619–1636)
In the 17th century the ruler of Samarkand, Yalangtush Bakhodur, ordered the construction of the Sher-Dor and Tillya-Kori madrasahs. 
The tiger mosaics with a rising sun on their back are especially interesting for their depiction of living beings and use of Persian motifs.

Tilya-Kori Madrasah (1646–1660)
Ten years later the Tilya-Kori (meaning "Gilded") Madrasah was built. It was not only a residential college for students, but also played the role of grand masjid (mosque). It has a two-storied main facade and a vast courtyard fringed by dormitory cells, with four galleries along the axes. The mosque building (see picture) is situated in the western section of the courtyard. The main hall of the mosque is abundantly gilded.

Other buildings

Mausoleum of Shaybanids
To the east of the Tilya-Kori Madrasah, the mausoleum of Shaybanids (16th century) is located (see picture). The real founder of Shaybanid power was Muhammad Shaybani—grandson of Abu'l-Khayr Khan. In 1500, with the backing of the Chaghataite Khanate, then based in Tashkent, Muhammad Shaybani conquered Samarkand and Bukhara from their last Timurid rulers. The founder of the dynasty then turned on his benefactors and in 1503 took Tashkent. He captured Khiva in 1506 and in 1507 he swooped down on Merv (Turkmenistan), eastern Persia, and western Afghanistan. The Shaybanids stopped the advance of the Safavids, who in 1502 had defeated the Akkoyunlu (Azerbaijan). Muhammad Shaybani was a leader of nomadic Uzbeks. During the ensuing years they substantially settled down in oases of Central Asia. The Uzbek invasion of the 15th century CE was the last component of today's Uzbek nation ethnogeny.

Chorsu trading dome
The trading dome Chorsu (1785) is situated right behind the Sher-Dor.

See also 
 Bibi-Khanym Mosque
 Gur-e Amir
 Shah-i-Zinda
 Timurid dynasty
 Tourism in Uzbekistan

References

External links 
 

Buildings and structures in Samarkand
Squares in Uzbekistan
Islamic architecture
Timurid dynasty
Madrasas in Uzbekistan